Wasserbourg is a commune in the Haut-Rhin department in Grand Est in north-eastern France.

Geography
Wasserbourg is situated in the Vosges Mountains, in the valley of the small river Krebsbach, and at the foot of the summit “Petit Ballon”. Surface area: 947 hectares.

History
The village was first mentioned in the 9th century. The first village name was Wasenberg until the 17th century, because of the field. 
The ruins of the Castle Strohbourg built in 1222, by Andréas de Gisberg, still stand today. It was probably inhabited until the 17th century.  But the access is forbidden to the public. This castle, situated on the top of a hill, allowed villagers to be informed when an attack was imminent.
 
This castle appears on the coat of arms of the village.

During the Protestant Reform, only Wasserbourg and Soultzbach stayed Catholic: almost the whole Munster Valley is Protestant.  The fact that these villages possess only one Church dates from this period (around 1550)
During the First World War, a funicular, which began in Soultzbach-Les-Bains, was suspended above the village. We can observe the relics of its terminus on the “Petit Ballon”.

Administration

Population

Monument

Church
The church is just after the city hall and is consecrated to St Michel. It was first built in the 13th century and was extended between 1830 and 1835. The Bell Tower was raised in 1870. 
Because of the First World War, the Church was damaged and was not renovated until 1923.

The organ in the Church was built in 1834 by Valentin Rinkenbach

Chapels
In the village, there are 5 little Chapels dedicated to the 4 Evangelists (St Marc, St Matthieu, St Luc, St Jean) and St Anne

Others
The Strohbourg ruins

Activity and commerce
Two farmers work in the village. On the spring the transhumance is an important event in which cows go to the pastures. 
These farmers sell milk and Munster cheese. 
In summer, these farmers have inns (Wassmatt and Strohberg) which offer local specialities. People can discover these traditional moments into the “Maison du fromage” in Gunsbach.

Demography and people
Some people still speak Alsatian. In 1999, most of the population was between 20 and 59 years old.

See also
 Communes of the Haut-Rhin department

References
"Journal d'informations municipales 2001-2002"
"Bulletin communal 1989"

Communes of Haut-Rhin